William Comes to Town is a 1948 British comedy film directed by Val Guest and starring William Graham and Garry Marsh. It was based on the Just William series of novels by Richmal Crompton. It served as a loose sequel to 1947 film Just William's Luck. It is also known by its U.S. alternative title William Goes to the Circus.

Plot
William Brown and his gang the Outlaws visit the Prime Minister in Downing Street to demand shorter school hours and better pay for kids. The newspaper publicity caused by their visit lands William and his friends in trouble with their parents. William almost ruins his chances of going to the circus (his parents made him promise to stay out of trouble), but somehow he finally finds his way there.

Cast
 William Graham - William Brown 
 Garry Marsh - Mr. Brown 
 Jane Welsh - Mrs. Brown 
 Hugh Cross - Robert Brown 
 Kathleen Stuart - Ethel Brown 
 Muriel Aked - Emily, the maid 
 A. E. Matthews - Minister for Economic Affairs 
 Brian Weske - Henry 
 James Crabbe - Douglas 
 Brian Roper - Ginger 
 Michael Balfour - Stall-holder 
 Michael Medwin - Reporter 
 Jon Pertwee - Circus Superintendent 
 David Page - Hubert Lane (as David Paige) 
 Norman Pierce - Police Sergeant 
 Eve Mortimer - Postmistress 
 John Powe - Glazier 
 Mary Vallange - Maid 
 Peter Butterworth - Postman 
 Donald Clive - Ethel's boyfriend 
 John Warren - 2nd Circus official 
 Alan Goford - 1st Circus official 
 Basil Gordon - 3rd Circus official 
 Claude Bonsor - 4th Circus official 
 Ivan Craig - 1st Carter 
 John Martell - 2nd Carter 
 Pinkie Hannaford - Small boy 
 Edward Malin - Toy Shop Man 
 Slim Rhyder - Tramp Cyclist
 Arthur Stanley - Oldest Inhabitant

Critical reception
Allmovie called the film, "one of the better efforts in this off-and-on series."

References

Bibliography
 Collins, Fiona & Ridgman, Jeremy. Turning the Page: Children's Literature in Performance and the Media. Peter Lang, 2006.

External links

dvd, of William Comes to Town

1948 films
1940s English-language films
Films directed by Val Guest
British black-and-white films
British comedy films
1948 comedy films
1940s British films